The 2004 United States Open Championship was the 104th U.S. Open, held June 17–20 at Shinnecock Hills Golf Club in Shinnecock Hills, New York. Retief Goosen won his second U.S. Open title, two strokes ahead of runner-up Phil Mickelson, the reigning Masters  The purse was $6.25 million with a winner's share of $1.125 

Late on Sunday in dry and breezy conditions, Goosen birdied the 16th hole and Mickelson double-bogeyed the par-3  Goosen's previous U.S. Open win was in 2001 in a playoff at Southern Hills.

History of U.S. Open at Shinnecock Hills 
This was the fourth U.S. Open hosted by Shinnecock Hills.  The former champions were James Foulis (1896), Raymond Floyd (1986), and Corey Pavin (1995). The second U.S. Open was held at Shinnecock in 1896, but ninety years went by before it hosted again. The 1986 edition was held on a completely revamped course. Floyd, age 43, entered the final round three shots behind and shot a 66 in difficult scoring conditions to win his fourth major.

The conditions were similar in 1995, with no one under par. Pavin played the final ten holes in three-under-par on the way to a 68 and the win. He hit a memorable 4-wood to the 72nd green to within  and finished at even par 280.

Course layout

Lengths of the course for previous major championships:
, par 70 - 1995 U.S. Open
, par 70 - 1986 U.S. Open
,  - 1896 U.S. Open

Field
1. Last 10 U.S. Open Champions
Ernie Els (4,8,9,10,11,13,16), Jim Furyk (8,9,16), Retief Goosen (9,10,16), Lee Janzen, Corey Pavin, Tiger Woods (3,4,5,9,11,12,16)
Steve Jones did not play.

2. Top two finishers in the 2003 U.S. Amateur
Nick Flanagan (a), Casey Wittenberg (a)

3. Last five Masters Champions
Phil Mickelson (11,16), Vijay Singh (9,11,12,16), Mike Weir (8,9,16)

4. Last five British Open Champions
Ben Curtis (16), David Duval, Paul Lawrie

5. Last five PGA Champions
Rich Beem, Shaun Micheel (16), David Toms (8,9,12,16)

6. The Players Champion
Adam Scott (10,11,12,16)

7. The U.S. Senior Open Champion
Bruce Lietzke did not play.

8. Top 15 finishers and ties in the 2003 U.S. Open
Jonathan Byrd, Tom Byrum, Pádraig Harrington (10,16), Freddie Jacobson (10,16), Jonathan Kaye (9,12,16), Cliff Kresge, Stephen Leaney (10,16), Billy Mayfair, Kenny Perry (9,12,16), Tim Petrovic, Nick Price (9,16), Eduardo Romero, Justin Rose, Hidemichi Tanaka, Scott Verplank (9,16)

9. Top 30 leaders on the 2003 PGA Tour official money list
Robert Allenby (16), Stuart Appleby (11,16), Briny Baird, Chad Campbell (11,16), K. J. Choi (16), Chris DiMarco (16), Brad Faxon (16), Steve Flesch (11,12,16), Fred Funk, Jay Haas (16), Tim Herron, Charles Howell III (16), Jerry Kelly (16), Justin Leonard (16), J. L. Lewis, Davis Love III (11,16), Chris Riley (16), Kirk Triplett (16), Bob Tway (16)

10. Top 15 on the 2003 European Tour Order of Merit
Thomas Bjørn (16), Michael Campbell, Paul Casey (16), Darren Clarke (13,16), Brian Davis, Trevor Immelman (16), Ian Poulter, Phillip Price, Lee Westwood

11. Top 10 on the PGA Tour official money list, as of May 30
Stewart Cink (16)

12. Winners of multiple PGA Tour events from April 23, 2003 through the 2004 Memorial Tournament

13. Top 2 from the 2004 European Tour Order of Merit, as of May 31

14. Top 2 on the 2003 Japan Golf Tour, provided they are within the top 75 point leaders of the Official World Golf Rankings at that time
Toshimitsu Izawa

15. Top 2 on the 2003 PGA Tour of Australasia, provided they are within the top 75 point leaders of the Official World Golf Rankings at that time
Peter Lonard (16)

16. Top 50 on the Official World Golf Rankings list, as of May 31
Stephen Ames, Ángel Cabrera, Fred Couples, Sergio García, Todd Hamilton, Joakim Haeggman, Scott Hoch, Miguel Ángel Jiménez, Zach Johnson, Shigeki Maruyama, Craig Parry

17. Special exemptions selected by the USGA
Raymond Floyd

Sectional qualifiers
Daly City, California: David Carr (L), Spencer Levin (a,L), Leif Olson (L), Roger Tambellini
Littleton, Colorado: John Douma, Steve Gotsche
Orlando, Florida: Nick Faldo, Tripp Isenhour, Camilo Villegas (L)
Atlanta, Georgia: Thomas Levet, Scott Weatherly (L)
Kahuku, Hawaii: Parker McLachlin (L)
North Barrington, Illinois: Robert Garrigus (L), Carl Paulson (L)
Rockville, Maryland: Carlos Franco, Pat Perez, Joey Sindelar, Omar Uresti (L), Bubba Watson (L)
St. Louis, Missouri: John Elliott (L), David Roesch (L)
Summit, New Jersey: Stephen Allan, Casey Bourque (L), Craig Bowden, Mark Brooks, Tom Carter, Kris Cox (L), Brian Gay, Matt Gogel, Dudley Hart, J. P. Hayes, Scott Hend, J. J. Henry, Gabriel Hjertstedt, Pete Jordan (L), Brad Lardon (L), Brock Mackenzie (a), Spike McRoy, David Morland IV, Dennis Paulson, Geoffrey Sisk (L), Steve Sokol (L), Kevin Stadler (L)
Columbus, Ohio: Eric Axley (L), Aaron Baddeley, Mark Calcavecchia, Alex Čejka, Daniel Chopra, Tim Clark, John Connelly (L), Bob Estes, David Faught, Dan Forsman, Jeff Gove (L), Jimmy Green (L), Bill Haas (a), Justin Hicks (L), Brendan Jones, Skip Kendall, Jeff Maggert, Joey Maxon (L), Joe Ogilvie, Dan Olsen (L), Payton Osborn (L), Tom Pernice Jr., Chez Reavie (a), John Rollins, Rory Sabbatini, John Senden, Chris Smith, Nathan Smith (a,L), Steve Stricker, Kevin Sutherland, Bo Van Pelt, Johnson Wagner (L), Duffy Waldorf
Sunriver, Oregon: Óscar David Álvarez (a)
Midway, Pennsylvania: Andrew Tschudin (L)
Richmond, Texas: Charleton Dechert (L), Tom Kite

Past champions in the field

Made the cut

Missed the cut

Round summaries

First round 
Thursday, June 17, 2004

Fifty-year-old Jay Haas led after one round, in a bid to become the oldest major champion in history. He was joined at the lead by Shigeki Maruyama and Ángel Cabrera. Two-time major champion Vijay Singh shot a solid 68, as did current Masters champion Phil Mickelson. Former U.S. Open champions Ernie Els and Retief Goosen shot an even-par 70 after rough starts. World Number 1 Tiger Woods struggled on Shinnecock's fast conditions and settled for a two-over-par 72. David Duval shot an 83, the worst round in the field, but was in high spirits afterwards.

Second round 
Friday, June 18, 2004

Phil Mickelson surged into the lead, trying to become the sixth to win the first two majors of the year, with a bogey-free 66. He tied for the lead with Shigeki Maruyama, who bogeyed the 18th hole and shot 68. Ernie Els had four consecutive birdies in a round of 67. Jeff Maggert was in solo third at five-under-par with a 67, while Fred Funk and Retief Goosen both shot 66 to tie for fourth. Ángel Cabrera had a crazy day after a 66 to shoot a 71.  Corey Pavin, the previous champion at Shinnecock in 1995, tied with Vijay Singh at four strokes back. Tiger Woods shot 69 for 141 (+1), tied for 18th. World Number 4 Davis Love III missed the cut, as did David Duval.

Jay Haas (E) and amateur Bill Haas (+5) were the second father and son to make the cut in the same U.S. Open; it was first accomplished 46 years earlier in 1948 by Joe Kirkwood Sr. and Joe Kirkwood Jr.

Amateurs: Levin (+2), Wittenberg (+2), Haas (+5), Reavie (+5),Mackenzie (+9), Smith (+9), Flanagan (+14), Álvarez (+18)

Third round 
Saturday, June 19, 2004

Retief Goosen battled his way into a two-shot lead on Saturday as Shinnecock Hills presented its stiffest test of the week. He held his nerve in challenging conditions to card a one-under 69 for 205 (−5), and was one of only three to break par. Second round leader Phil Mickelson bogeyed the last two holes for a share of second place with two-time champion Ernie Els. Fred Funk and Shigeki Maruyama both had crazy days, finishing poorly for a tie for fourth. Jeff Maggert's 74 dropped him into a tie for sixth with Tim Clark, who had 66, the best of the day; Tiger Woods eagled the 18th for 73 and Vijay Singh stumbled with

Final round 
Sunday, June 20, 2004

Retief Goosen held his nerve and won his second U.S. Open, edging out Phil Mickelson by two shots with a closing 71 (+1) on Sunday to finish at four-under 276. Conditions were brutal on the final day when the average final-round score was 78.7 and no one was  Mickelson, urged on by raucous New York galleries on a windswept sunny afternoon, completed a matching 71 for his third runner-up spot in the last six U.S. Opens. Goosen led by two going into the final day, but was overtaken by Mickelson in the closing stretch, with back-to-back birdies on 15 and 16. In the final pair with compatriot Ernie Els, Goosen restored his two-shot advantage with a  birdie putt on 16 and parred the final two holes to seal 

In a nearly unprecedented action, the USGA watered a few of the greens during play including the 7th green when players were not able to prevent the ball from rolling off.  As a result the leaders faced much easier playing conditions than the rest of the field and the final 5 groups had a scoring average of 75.9, compared to the field's 78.7, including 3 of the 5 lowest rounds of the day.

Jeff Maggert (72) finished third at one-over 281, while 2003 Masters champion Mike Weir (74) and Shigeki Maruyama (76) were three shots further back at 284 in a tie for fourth. World number two Els, joint second overnight with Mickelson, produced four double-bogeys on his way to an 80 (+10), his worst score in a U.S. Open, and tied for ninth at 287. Top-ranked Tiger Woods, who began nine shots off the  battled to a 76 and a share of 17th place. A mix of five bogeys, a double-bogey and a birdie at the last left him at 290 (+10) as he narrowly avoided his worst round at a  His career high of 77 came as an amateur in 1996, in the third round at Oakland Hills. Robert Allenby had the low round of the day at even-par 70; three birdies and three bogeys lifted him into a tie for seventh with Steve Flesch at six-over 286; Fred Funk (77) was alone in sixth on 285.

Amateurs: Levin (+8), Wittenberg (+16), Haas (+17), Reavie (+24)

Scorecard

Cumulative tournament scores, relative to par
{|class="wikitable" span = 50 style="font-size:85%;
|-
|style="background: Pink;" width=10|
|Birdie
|style="background: PaleGreen;" width=10|
|Bogey
|style="background: Green;" width=10|
|Double bogey
|}

References

External links
USOpen.com – 2004

U.S. Open (golf)
Golf in New York (state)
Sports in Long Island
U.S. Open
U.S. Open (golf)
U.S. Open (golf)
U.S. Open (golf)